Operation Starvation was a naval mining operation conducted in World War II by the United States Army Air Forces to disrupt Japanese shipping.

Operation
The mission was initiated at the insistence of Admiral Chester Nimitz who wanted his naval operations augmented by an extensive mining of Japan itself conducted by the air force.  While General Henry H. Arnold felt this was strictly a naval priority, he assigned General Curtis LeMay to carry it out.

LeMay assigned one group of about 160 aircraft of the 313th Bombardment Wing to the task, with orders to plant 2,000 mines in April 1945.
The mining runs were made by individual B-29 Superfortresses at night at moderately low altitudes. Radar provided mine release information.  The 313th Bombardment Wing received preliminary training in aerial mining theory while their B-29 aircraft received bomb-bay modification to carry mines.  Individual aircrew were then given four to eight training flights involving five radar approaches on each flight and dummy mine drops on the last flight.

Beginning on March 27, 1945, 1,000 parachute-retarded influence mines with magnetic and acoustic exploders were initially dropped, followed by many more, including models with water pressure displacement exploders.  This mining proved the most efficient means of destroying Japanese shipping during World War II.  In terms of damage per unit of cost, it surpassed strategic bombing and the United States submarine campaign.

Eventually most of the major ports and straits of Japan were repeatedly mined, severely disrupting Japanese logistics and troop movements for the remainder of the war with 35 of 47 essential convoy routes having to be abandoned.
For instance, shipping through Kobe declined by 85%, from 320,000 tons in March to only 44,000 tons in July.
Operation Starvation sank more ship tonnage in the last six months of the war than the efforts of all other sources combined.  The Twentieth Air Force flew 1,529 sorties and laid 12,135 mines in twenty-six fields on forty-six separate missions.  Mining demanded only 5.7% of the XXI Bomber Command's total sorties, and only fifteen B-29s were lost in the effort. In return, mines sank or damaged 670 ships totaling more than 1,250,000 tons.

Aftermath

After the war, the commander of Japan's mine sweeping operations noted that he thought this mining campaign could have directly led to the defeat of Japan on its own had it begun earlier. Similar conclusions were reached by American analysts who reported in July 1946 in the Strategic Bombing Survey that it would have been more efficient to combine the United States' effective anti-shipping submarine effort with land- and carrier-based air power to strike harder against merchant shipping and begin a more extensive aerial mining campaign earlier in the war. This would have starved Japan, forcing an earlier end to the war.

See also
Air raids on Japan

References

External links
  Mines Away!, by Major John S. Chilstrom, USAF, 1992 (PDF) (via archive.org) 
 Operation Starvation, by Captain Gerald A. Mason, USN, 2002 (via archive.org)

Starvation
April 1945 events
1945 in Japan
Naval mines
United States Army Air Forces
Aerial operations and battles of World War II involving the United States